Club Bàsquet Sant Josep was a professional basketball team based in Girona, Catalonia, Spain.

History
The club was founded in 1962 by Ramon Sitjà as CB Sant Josep. In 1989 it became the Anonymous Sport Association (SAD). In 1987, when the ACB was enlarged to 24 teams, CB Girona entered the first division. In 1991, the club had to buy the rights of the Granollers EB to stay in the ACB as they were going to be relegated to the second division.

In 2007, Girona won the FIBA EuroCup championship, which was hosted at Palau Girona-Fontajau arena. They beat Azovmash Mariupol in the final after having beaten Adecco Estudiantes in the semifinals.

After the end of the 2007–2008 season, CB Girona suffered serious economic problems, with a debt of over €6 million euros. On July 25, 2008, the club announced that it would not participate in the 2008–09 season of either the Spanish ACB League or the Eurocup.

The SAD was dissolved original CB Sant Josep Girona was kept for beginning playing in Adecco Bronce, the fourth level Spanish division.

In the 2009–10 season, Sant Josep bought a LEB Oro place from CB Vic and played the quarterfinals of the promotion playoffs. On the next season, Girona finished in fourth position, arriving to the semifinals. In summer 2012, after three season spent at LEB Oro, the club resigns to its spot in the league and decides to continue playing in Liga EBA, Spanish fourth division.

In April 2013, CB Sant Josep announced it would be dissolved at the end of the 2012–13 season.

Logos

Season by season

Participations in European competitions
1989-90 Korać Cup: Eliminated in the second round
1999-00 Korać Cup: Eliminated in the semifinals
2000-01 Korać Cup: Eliminated in the second round
2006-07 FIBA EuroCup: CHAMPIONS
2007-08 ULEB Cup: runners up

Trophies and awards

Trophies
FIBA EuroCup: (1)
2007
Catalan League: (2)
1996, 2006
LEB Catalan league: (2)
2009, 2010

Individual awards
ACB Most Valuable Player
Darryl Middleton – 1992, 1993, 2000
Marc Gasol – 2008
All-ACB Team
Marc Gasol – 2008
All LEB Oro First Team
Levi Rost – 2011

Sponsors
 1987–1998: Valvi Supermercats, the club was renamed Valvi Girona
 1998–1999: No sponsor, the club was renamed Girona Gavis
 1999–2005: Casademont, the club was renamed Casademont Girona
 2005–2008: Akasvayu, the club was renamed Akasvayu Girona
 2008–2010: No sponsor, the club was renamed CB Sant Josep Girona
 2010–2012: Girona FC, the club was renamed the name of the football team
 2012–2013: No sponsor, the club was renamed CB Sant Josep Girona

Notable players
 Joaquim Costa Puig
 Jordi Pardo
 Josep Cargol
 Duško Ivanović
 Francesc Solana
 Darryl Middleton
 Terrell Myers
 Xavi Fernàndez
 Rafael Jofresa
 Marc Gasol
 Dainius Šalenga
 Gregor Fučka
 Anthony Goldwire
 Marko Marinović
 Marko Kešelj
 Branko Jorović
 Xavi Vallmajó

Notable coaches
 Svetislav Pešić

Arena
CB Girona plays in Palau Girona-Fontajau, which has a capacity of 5,049 spectators. The arena was inaugurated in 1993 by NBA player Moses Malone, at a match between the local team Valvi Girona and PAOK Salonica.
 Palau Girona-Fontajau

Supporter groups
Dalinians
Engaviats
Penya Polska

"Girona a l'ACB" platform

"Girona a l'ACB" platform (translated from Catalan: Girona in ACB) was created on May 23, 2008, by CB Girona fans. Its purpose was to support the team and the club so they could get rid of the debt and continue playing in the top Spanish division the next year. A website was created for that  , and there were more than 10,500 signatures collected. Some protests were also made, like a demonstration with over 1,100 people, a basketball match in front of the city hall and a sit-down protest, amongst other actions. 300 T-shirts were also sold.

References

Basketball teams established in 1962
Catalan basketball teams
CB Girona
Liga EBA teams
Former LEB Oro teams
Former Liga ACB teams
Basketball teams disestablished in 2013
Defunct basketball teams in Spain